State Route 292 (SR 292) is a short state highway on the northern edge of Humboldt County, Nevada, United States, that serves the community of Denio.



Route description
SR 292 is a two-lane road entirely within the southern part of the Pueblo Valley. The route begins at a T intersection with State Route 140 (SR 140) in Denio Junction. (From the intersection, southbound SR 140 heads south and then east to end at U.S. Route 95 [US 95], east-northeast of Amos. Northbound SR 140 heads westerly to the Oregon state line to connect with Oregon Route 140.) The route ends at the Oregon state line. From SR 292's northern terminus, the road continues northward into Oregon as Harney County Route 201 (Fields-Denio Road), heading towards Fields.

History
SR 292 was originally part of the former State Route 8A. That route, established by 1929, connected State Route 8 (now US 95) to Vya via Denio. SR 8A was realigned to bypass Denio by 1949, leaving the highway into Denio without a state highway number. The road was designated as State Route 292 on July 1, 1976, as part of the renumbering of Nevada's state highway system. However, the new route number was not seen on official Nevada highway maps until 1993.

Major intersections

See also

 List of state routes in Nevada
 List of highways numbered 292

Notes

References

External links

292
Transportation in Humboldt County, Nevada